Coppelia, the Animated Doll was a 1900 French short silent film by Georges Méliès. It was sold by Méliès's Star Film Company and is numbered 307–308 in its catalogues.

The film is modeled on the 1870 ballet Coppélia, which itself is loosely based on E. T. A. Hoffmann's story "The Sandman". The ballet —probably acting alongside the version of the same story in Jacques Offenbach's The Tales of Hoffmann— inspired Méliès on numerous occasions, including a stage illusion at his Théâtre Robert-Houdin as well as various others of his films, such as An Up-to-Date Conjuror (1899) and Extraordinary Illusions (1903).

Coppelia, the Animated Doll is currently presumed lost.

References

External links
 

French black-and-white films
Films directed by Georges Méliès
French silent short films
Films based on The Sandman (short story)
1900s French films